The 2019–20 Mountain West Conference men's basketball season began with practices in October 2019, followed by the start of the 2019–20 NCAA Division I men's basketball season in November. Conference play began in December 2019 and concluded in February 2020. This season marked the 20th season of Mountain West Conference basketball.

Preseason

Coaching changes
On March 15, 2019, UNLV head coach Marvin Menzies was fired after three seasons. On March 27, 2019, South Dakota State head coach T. J. Otzelberger was announced as the new head coach of UNLV.

On April 7, 2019, Nevada head coach Eric Musselman resigned after four seasons to become the head coach of Arkansas. On April 11, 2019, former UCLA and New Mexico head coach Steve Alford was announced as the new head coach of Nevada.

Media Day
The Mountain West Men's Basketball Media Day was held at Green Valley Ranch in Henderson, Nevada.

Preseason poll
Utah State received all 17 first-place votes in the conference media poll.

Preseason awards

Preseason All-Conference team

Watchlists

Regular season

Conference matrix

Postseason

Mountain West tournament

All-Conference Teams and Awards

Notes and references